The 71st Air Refueling Squadron is an inactive United States Air Force unit. It was last assigned to the 458th Operations Group at Barksdale AFB, Louisiana where it was inactivated on 1 April 1994.

The squadron was first activated as the 471st Bombardment Squadron in the summer of 1942 and assigned to the 334th Bombardment Group at Greenville AAB, South Carolina.  It operated as a North American B-25 Mitchell aircrew replacement training unit until it was disbanded in the spring of 1944.

The 71st Air Refueling Squadron was activated in 1955 at Dow Air Force Base, Maine and equipped with Boeing KC-97 Stratofreighters. In March 1964 the squadron reequipped with Boeing KC-135 Stratotankers and when Dow closed in 1968, moved to Barksdale AFB, Louisiana, remaining there until it was inactivated as part of reorganization of air refueling squadrons by Air Mobility Command in 1994.  While at Barksdale, the two squadrons were consolidated.

History

World War II
The 471st Bombardment Squadron was activated in the summer of 1942 as one of the four original squadrons of the 334th Bombardment Group at Greenville AAB, South Carolina. It operated as a North American B-25 Mitchell replacement training unit.  Replacement training units were oversized units which trained aircrews prior to their deployment to combat theaters. However, Army Air Forces found that standard military units, based on relatively inflexible tables of organization were proving less well adapted to the training mission.  Accordingly, a more functional system was adopted in which each base was organized into a separate numbered unit. This resulted in the 471st, along with other units at Greenville, being disbanded in the spring of 1944 and being replaced by the 330th AAF Base Unit (Replacement Training Unit, Medium, Bombardment).

Air Refueling operations
The 71st Air Refueling Squadron was activated at Dow Air Force Base, Maine in January 1955. The squadron was designated for refueling strategic fighters and was to be colocated with the 506th Strategic Fighter Wing at Dow.  However the 506th moved to Tinker Air Force Base, Oklahoma and the squadron was assigned directly to Eighth Air Force headquarters until the 4060th Air Refueling Wing was organized as the Strategic Air Command (SAC) wing at Dow.  The squadron was equipped with KC-97F Stratotankers (also KC-97Gs). The squadron was redesignated as the 71st Air Refueling Squadron, Medium on 15 December 1957 and acted as a forward based refueling units supporting Boeing B-47 Stratojet bombers and fighter aircraft deploying to and from Europe.

In February 1960, the 4038th Strategic Wing was activated at Dow as part of SAC's plan to disperse its Boeing B-52 Stratofortress heavy bombers over a larger number of bases, thus making it more difficult for the Soviet Union to knock out the entire fleet with a surprise first strike and the squadron was reassigned to it.  The squadron continued to fly KC-97s, however, until 1964 when it reequipped with Boeing KC-135 Stratotankers. The squadron provided long range air refueling support and participated in military exercises and special operations.  It deployed aircraft and aircrews to Europe, the Middle East, and Alaska supporting the European, Alaskan, and Pacific Tanker Task Forces while maintaining a high state of combat readiness. The 71st also supported USAF operations in Southeast Asia.

Dow closed as an active USAF base in the spring of 1968 and most units there inactivated.  The 71st, however relocated to Barksdale AFB, Louisiana, where it was assigned to the 2d Bombardment Wing. in 1968 remaining there until inactivation.  While at Barksdale, the 471st Bombardment Squadron was consolidated with the 71st.  When SAC implemented the Objective Wing organization in the fall of 1991, the squadron was reassigned to the newly activated 2d Operations Group, but this assignment lasted only until 1993 when Air Combat Command transferred its air refueling units to Air Mobility Command (AMC) in 1993.  As AMC reorganized its tanker fleet, it removed its tankers from Barksdale and the 71st was inactivated on 1 April 1994.

Lineage

471st Bombardment Squadron
 Constituted as the 471st Bombardment Squadron (Medium) on 9 July 1942
 Activated on 16 July 1942
 Disbanded on 1 May 1944
 Reconstituted on 19 September 1985 and consolidated with the 71st Air Refueling Squadron

71st Air Refueling Squadron
 Constituted as the 71st Air Refueling Squadron, Strategic Fighter on 4 November 1954
 Activated on 24 January 1955
 Redesignated 71st Air Refueling Squadron, Medium on 15 December 1957
 Redesignated 71st Air Refueling Squadron, Heavy on 1 March 1964
 Consolidated with the 471st Bombardment Squadron on 19 September 1985
 Redesignated 71st Air Refueling Squadron on 1 September 1991
 Inactivated on 1 October 1994

Assignments

 334th Bombardment Group: 16 July 1942 – 1 May 1944
 Eighth Air Force: 24 Jan 1955 (attached to 506th Strategic Fighter Wing)
 4060th Air Refueling Wing: 8 March 1955
 4038th Strategic Wing:  1 February 1960

 397th Bombardment Wing: 1 February 1963 (attached to 2d Bombardment Wing after 1 April 1968)
 2d Bombardment Wing:  15 April 1968
 2d Operations Group: 1 September 1991
 458th Operations Group: 1 October 1993 – 1 April 1994

Stations
 Greenville Army Air Base, South Carolina, 16 July 1942 – 1 May 1944
 Dow Air Force Base, Maine, 24 January 1955
 Barksdale Air Force Base, Louisiana, 15 April 1968 – 1 June 1994

Aircraft
 B-25 Mitchell, 1942-1944
 KC-97 Stratofreighter, 1955-1964
 KC-135 Stratotanker, 1964-1994

Awards and campaigns

References

Notes
 Explanatory notes

 Citations

Bibliography

 
  (subscription required for web access)

External links

071
Military units and formations established in 1944
Military units and formations established in 1954